Sapey Common is a small village in Herefordshire, England, near the border with Worcestershire,  north east of Bromyard .

Although the area is in Herefordshire, the post town is Worcester and the postcode WR6.

Recently introduced to the area were the newly built 'Manors of Shelsley' which, although claimed to be in the heart of the Teme Valley, are in fact in Sapey Common - which overlooks the heart of the Teme Valley.

The area is home to three-five local farms and is a neighbourhood watch area.

Introduced to Sapey Common in mid-March 2008 was a compulsory 30 mph speed limit.

Villages in Herefordshire